Mayureswar Assembly constituency is an assembly constituency in Birbhum district in the Indian state of West Bengal.

Overview
As per orders of the Delimitation Commission, No. 290 Mayureswar Assembly constituency is composed of the following: Mayureswar I and Mayureswar II CD Blocks.

Mayureswar Assembly constituency is part of No. 41 Bolpur (Lok Sabha constituency) (SC).

Members of Legislative Assembly

Election results

2021

2011

In the 2011 elections, Ashok Kumar Ray of CPI(M) defeated his nearest rival Jatil Mondal of Trinamool Congress.

 

Trinamool Congress did not contest the seat in 2006.

1977–2006
In the 2006 state assembly elections, Sadhu Charan Bagdi of CPI(M) won the Mayureswar (SC) assembly seat defeating his nearest rival Subhas Chandra Mandal of BJP. Contests in most years were multi cornered but only winners and runners are being mentioned. Bishnu Let of CPI(M) defeated Kestopada Bagdi of Trinamool Congress in 2001, Arjun Saha of BJP in 1996, Ajay Saha of BJP in 1991, Kamalakant Mondal of Congress/ ICS 1987 and 1982. Panchanan Let of CPI(M) defeated Gunakar Mandal of Janata Party in 1977.

1962–1972
Lalchand Fulamali of CPI won in 1972 and 1971. Panchanan Let of CPI(M) won in 1969. Kanai Lal Saha of Congress won in 1967. Gobardhan Das of CPI won in 1962. Prior to that the constituency was not there.

References

Assembly constituencies of West Bengal
Politics of Birbhum district